Emil of Lönneberga (from Swedish: Emil i Lönneberga) is a series of children's novels, written by Astrid Lindgren in 1963, 1966 and 1970 respectively, about the prankster Emil Svensson who lives on a farm in the Lönneberga village of Småland, Sweden.

In total twelve books were written between 1963 and 1997, which have appeared in 44 languages (2014), in most cases with the original Swedish illustrations by Björn Berg. There are three Swedish movie adaptations, released in 1971–1973.

Emil the character
Emil Svensson lives on the farm Katthult ("Catholt"), set in the village of Lönneberga in Småland around the year 1900, with his younger sister Ida, mother Alma and father Anton, the farmhand Alfred who loves Emil and the farm maid Lina who, however, is unable to tolerate Emil's pranks ("hyss"). Sometimes Krösa-Maja ("Lingonberry-Maia") comes to Katthult to help with domestic work and tell Emil and Ida stories about "mylingar", ghosts, murders and similar nasties. Emil does more pranks ("hyss") than there are days of the year, which one day make the inhabitants of the village angry, so they collect money for Emil's mother to send Emil to America, but she gets angry and refuses, stating that "Emil is a nice little boy, we love him just the way he is". Alma writes down all Emil's pranks ("hyss") in blue notebooks, in order to let Emil remember what he has done as a child when being an adult and then chairman of the Lönneberga village council. Emil is very resourceful and handy with all types of farm animal.

In the three novels, written in 1963, 1966 and 1970 respectively, one may follow some of Emil's many pranks ("hyss"), for example:

One day when meat soup is served at Katthult, Emil puts his head into the big soup bowl, which gets stuck over his head.
A day in June, when a party is to be held at Katthult, Emil manages to raise up his little sister in the flagpole, and gets shut up by his father into the toolshed, as a punishment for his prank ("hyss"), where Emil always carves a wooden figure while waiting for being released. However, this time, Emil manages to espace on a plank he puts between the open windows in the toolshed and the food shed on the opposite side, and has his own party in the food shed with sausages, except the last sausage, with is served to Mrs Petrell who has traveled all the way from Vimmerby just to eat Alma's sausage.
One day in July, Emil traps his father in a rat trap, and later heaves both betters of palt and raggmunk on his father's face, and carves his 100th wooden figure.
On the last day of October, an autumn market is held in Vimmerby and a comet is expected to hit the Earth. In Vimmerby, Emil manages to scare Mrs Petrell as well as the mayor of Vimmerby and the inhabitants of the town overall - but also acquire the horse Lukas without charge.
On the day after Christmas Day, Alfred's grandfather Stolle-Jocke comes to Katthult, along with Lill-Klossan, from the poorhouse, to tell that they haven't got any Christmas food ("julmat") to eat and Jocke hasn't got any snus, even though Emil's mother sent Emil to the poorhouse with a big basket of Christmas food and a little box of snus for Jocke, because Kommandoran ("the commanderess (of the poorhouse)") sabotaged everything by taking all of the Christmas food (and Jocke's snus) for herself. Emil manages to invite everyone from the poorhouse except Kommandoran to Katthult for a Christmas party, later referred to as the Big Tabberas in Katthult ("Stora Tabberaset i Katthult"), with the Christmas food left in the food shed which, however, was for the next day when the relatives in Ingatorp are invited for Christmas party (but Emil thinks they are "fat enough" and the poorhouse people need the food better). When Kommandoran comes to Katthult, in order to force them home to the poorhouse, she accidentally gets captured in a wolf pit Emil managed to dig in order to capture an eventual wolf. Emil think it was a necessary punishment for Kommandoran, for her sins towards Stolle-Jocke and the other poor people. Finally, Emil forgives Kommandoran and tells Alfred to help her up from the wolf pit, upon which she escapes from Katthult forever.
In June the following summer, when the people of the Backhorva farm plan to emigrate to America, they hold an auction in which Emil manages to make several ludicrous but eventually successful deals which, however, make his father angry. The next day, Emil pretends Ida having typhus by painting her face blue. One summer night, the pig sow Emil's father bought in the auction gives birth to eleven piglets, but bites ten of them to death before Emil luckily rescues the eleventh. A few days later, the sow dies of some strange illness. Emil desires to breed the little piglet, as he were its mother.
One summer day, when Emil's mother brews cherry wine for Mrs Petrell, Emil and the piglet accidentally eat the brewed cherries which make them drunk so that they cause terrible problems. The next day, they have recovered, and are invited to Lönneberga Good Templar Association, to swear a promise to be sober forever, and thereafter keeps the whole Katthult in soberness, firstly by crushing the bottles with Mrs Petrell's cherry wine. In late August, it is time for Emil to start school, where he proves to be the best one in his class.
A Sunday in November, a "husförhör" (a "house interview" in which the priest examines the household's knowledge of the Bible and Luther's Small Catechism) is held at Katthult, during which Emil's mother feels angry for Lina, who just gives wrong answers to the priest's questions mainly about Adam and Eve. After the end of "husförhöret", it is a great dinner with ostkaka ("cheesecake") as dessert. After eating ostkaka, Emil's mother tells Emil to go out and lock the hen shed, but Emil also manages to lock the outhouse, without any awareness that there is someone inside, and then shuts up his own father, who gets furious and attempts to get out through the window above the door, but gets stuck and can't get away before Alfred finally comes with a hand saw and cuts him free.
In the final chapter of the book series, Alfred cuts himself in the left thumb when carving räfsepinnar ("rake sticks") along with Emil, and becomes seriously ill in what is believed to be sepsis shortly before Christmas, when Småland is hit by a heavy snow storm. Despite the storm, and his parents' word that it's impossible to go to doctor, Emil desires one early morning, before anyone has woken up, to take Alfred on a sleigh to the doctor in Mariannelund, where Emil and the horse Lukas finally arrive after a tough struggle through the heavy snow and finally thanks to help from a snowplow. The day before Christmas Eve, Alfred may travel back home, still with bandage over his thumb, and everyone in Lönneberga feels happy over Emil for his heroic act.

In other languages
In Denmark, Emil is known as Emil fra Lønneberg.

In Germany, Emil is known as Michel aus Lönneberga for marketing reasons, as another "Emil" was established on the children's book market both in East and West Germany in the 1960s: the boy Emil Tischbein from Erich Kästner's Emil und die Detektive from the 1920s.

In Iceland, the books are known as Emil í Kattholti and have gained considerable success.

In Italy, Emil is known as Emil, and his Swedish movies were shown on RAI TV in 1974.

In Poland, the books are known as Emil ze Smalandii.

In France, Emil was rechristened Zozo la Tornade ("Zozo Tornado").

In Finland, Emil is known as Vaahteramäen Eemeli, "Eemeli of Vaahteramäki". Vaahteramäki is a direct translation of Lönneberga ("Maple Hill").

In The Netherlands, Emil is known as Michiel van de Hazelhoeve.

In Portugal Emil is known as Emilio de Lönneberga.

In Russia Emil is known as Эмиль из Лённеберги.

In Spain, Emil is known as Miguel el travieso.

Film adaptations
 Emil i Lönneberga (1971)
 Nya hyss av Emil i Lönneberga (1972)
 Emil och griseknoen (1973)
 Michel aus Lönneberga, a German-Swedish TV series based on the three films.
 Emīla nedarbi (1985), Latvian TV film
 That Boy Emil (2013)

Notes

External links
 Emil i Lönneberga on astridlindgren.se
 Emil in the Soup Tureen video with English subtitles (13 minutes)
 Emil in the Soup Tureen sample chapter in Portuguese (Emílio Dentro da Terrina)

Astrid Lindgren characters
Swedish children's novels
Novel series
Novels set in Småland
Swedish children's literature
Fictional Swedish people
Child characters in literature
Male characters in literature
Comedy literature characters
1963 Swedish novels
Literary characters introduced in 1963
1963 establishments in Sweden
Fictional tricksters
1963 children's books
Book series introduced in 1963